is a professional Japanese baseball player. He is a pitcher for the Saitama Seibu Lions of Nippon Professional Baseball (NPB).

References 

2000 births
Living people
Nippon Professional Baseball pitchers
Baseball people from Saitama Prefecture
Saitama Seibu Lions players